The Indian Super League Golden Boot is an annual association football award presented to the leading goalscorer in the Indian Super League. 

For sponsorship purposes, it was known as the Alto K10 Golden Boot from 2014 to 2015, the Swift Golden Boot from 2016 to 2019 and the Maruti Suzuki Golden Boot in 2020.

The Indian Super League was founded in 2013, eight teams competed in the 2014 inaugural season. It became the joint top-tier of Indian football league system by 2017–18 season and is the top-tier since 2022–23 season. Elano of Chennaiyin won the inaugural award in 2014. Coro won the Golden Boot award twice with Goa, more than any other player. Each of Bartholomew Ogbeche (Kerala Blasters), Roy Krishna (ATK) and Nerijus Valskis (Chennaiyin) scored 15 goals in 2019–20 season. In assist count tie-breaker, both Krishna and Valskis were tied on 6 assists. Having played lesser minutes, Valskis was awarded the Golden Boot.

Winners

Awards won by nationality

Awards won by club

See also 
 Indian Super League
 Indian Super League Hero of the League
 Indian Super League Golden Glove
 Indian Super League Winning Pass of the League
 Indian Super League Emerging Player of the League

References

External links
 Indian Super League website

Golden Boot
Top sports lists
Awards established in 2014
Association football player non-biographical articles